Older... Budweiser is the third full-length album by Gang Green.

It was released in 1989, a year after the EP I81B4U. It was the last full album of new material to emerge from the band until 1997's EP, Back & Gacked, but was followed by a live album, Can't LIVE Without It in 1990.

After the album was released, bass player Joe Gittleman was sacked and replaced by D.R.I.'s Josh Pappe in time to tour.

It was the first time the band had recorded outside of their Boston, Massachusetts hometown as well. Rhode Island was the new setting, with Tom Soares replacing Daniel Rey at the mixing and production table.

Overview
A change of scenery, to Rhode Island saw a marked change in sound for the band, although it had the same members as had performed previously.

Songwriting was no longer a solo effort on the part of Doherty with a few token collaborations. Nearly every track was written in partnership with another member – even Joe Gittleman was the sole writer of two tracks; this may be contributing to his urge to form a new band which he was free to do after this release.

The lyrics changed from fun, beer-drinking, womanizing anthems to more socio-political themes – except "Bedroom of Doom" which reverted to form, albeit momentarily. "We Can Go" was an acknowledgement that they knew they had disappointed some fans by "selling out" or "going metal" – but it contained the message that no matter what the genre, they could still enjoy a punk or metal show as it was the music – not the dress code or hair length – which counted.

"Church of Fun" was a stab at the widespread prominence of evangelism – it was almost obligatory for bands, whether metal or punk, to write a song on this subject.

Musically, the up-beat funtime catchy melody had dissipated somewhat, making way for a darker mood which only returns on "Bedroom of Doom" only to give way to full on thrash metal on "Casio Jungle" – an attack on electronica music. The songs are slower, which means they are not played as fast as they can possibly go with this band.

There is even a song featuring an orchestra – "Ballad" – which although was tongue-in-cheek was still a departure in genre even for that time.

Overall, the album appeased the hardcore punk fans with its "local" Boston Hardcore-style sound. It also still bore a certain amount of metallic attributes to keep the thrash fans happy – even they could not deny the message in "We Can Go" – and above all, proved the band had more than one dimension lyrically – this obviously being the point, according to the album's punworthy title.

Track listing
"Church of Fun" (Chris Doherty, Brian Betzger) – 3:10
"Just One Bullet" (Doherty, Betzger) –	3:00
"We Can Go" (Joe Gittleman, Doherty) –	2:19
"Tear Down the Walls" (Fritz Erickson, Doherty) – 3:11
"Flight 911" (Doherty)	– 3:57
"Bedroom of Doom" (Doherty, Erickson) – 4:16
"Casio Jungle"	(Doherty, Betzger) – 2:22
"Why Should You" (Gittleman) – 3:44
"I'm Still Young" (Gang Green) – 2:37
"Ballad" (Erickson, Doherty) –	2:29

Credits
 Chris Doherty – vocals, guitar
 Fritz Erickson – guitar
 Joe Gittleman – bass
 Brian Betzger – drums
 Rich Spillberg of Wargasm – additional musician
 Ralph Petrarcha – additional musician
 Orchestra on "Ballad":
Guido Antipastianio – cello
Carmine Pelegrino – piano
Stephanie Liebowitz – harp
Antony Rizelli – violin 1
Herbert Boletti – violin 2
Vinny Scalisi – trumpet
Tommy Stromboli – trombone
Louie Bianelli – tuba
 Recorded and mixed in 1989 at Normandy Sound, Warren, Rhode Island, U.S.
 Produced and engineered by Tom Soares
 Assistant engineered by Jamie Locke

External links
Taang Records band page
Trouserpress entry for Gang Green
More info on Gang Green

1989 albums
Gang Green albums